The 1876 State of the Union Address was given by the 18th president of the United States, Ulysses S. Grant, on Tuesday, December 5, 1876.  In it he said these words, "Reconstruction Era, as finally agreed upon, means this and only this, except that the late slave was enfranchised, giving an increase, as was supposed, to the Union-loving and Union-supporting votes. If free in the full sense of the word, they would not disappoint this expectation. Hence at the beginning of my first Administration the work of reconstruction, much embarrassed by the long delay, virtually commenced."

References 

State of the Union addresses
Presidency of Ulysses S. Grant
Works by Ulysses S. Grant
44th United States Congress
State of the Union Address
State of the Union Address
State of the Union Address
1876 documents
December 1876 events
State of the Union